The 2012–13 Tampa Bay Lightning season was the franchise's 21st season in the National Hockey League (NHL). The regular season was reduced from its usual 82 games to 48 due to the 2012–13 NHL lockout.

Regular season
The Lightning began the season with one of the best starts in franchise history, earning a 6–1–0 record. However, since that seventh game, the team went 7–16–1, falling to 14th out of 15 teams in the Eastern Conference. This prompted general manager Steve Yzerman to fire head coach Guy Boucher on March 24, 2013 after a 5-3 loss to the Ottawa Senators(who he would eventually end up coaching). Boucher was in his third year as the team's head coach.

One day later, the Lightning named Jon Cooper as the team's new head coach. Cooper was first hired by the organization in 2010 to coach the Lightning's American Hockey League (AHL) affiliate, the Norfolk Admirals, and after the Lightning changed affiliates, the Syracuse Crunch. While coaching the Admirals in the 2011–12 season, the team won 28 consecutive games and would go on to win the Calder Cup, sweeping the championship series. At the time of Cooper's naming as Lightning head coach, ten players on the team's roster had played for Cooper in Syracuse at some point during the season.

With goaltending having been an issue for the team all season, on April 3, the day of the trade deadline, the Lightning acquired Ben Bishop from the Ottawa Senators. In return, the Lightning dealt rookie left wing Cory Conacher, who at the time was second in the League in points among first-year players with 24, and led all rookies in assists with 15. The Lightning also gave up a fourth-round pick in the 2013 NHL Entry Draft.

The Lightning tied the Montreal Canadiens for the fewest shorthanded goals scored with zero.

Standings

Divisional standings

Conference standings

Schedule and results

Preseason
As a result of the 2012–13 NHL lockout, the entire pre-season was canceled.

Regular season
Due to the 2012–13 NHL lockout, the Lightning's original 82-game schedule was reduced to a 48-game schedule in which they would face only teams from the Eastern Conference.

|-  style="text-align:center; background:#cfc;"
| 1 || January 19 || Washington Capitals || 6–3 ||  || Lindback || Tampa Bay Times Forum || 19,204 || 1–0–0 || 2 || 
|-  style="text-align:center; background:#fcc;"
| 2 || January 21 || @ New York Islanders || 3–4 ||  || Lindback || Nassau Veterans Memorial Coliseum || 15,322 || 1–1–0 || 2 || 
|-  style="text-align:center; background:#cfc;"
| 3 || January 22 || @ Carolina Hurricanes || 4–1 ||  || Garon || PNC Arena || 18,680 || 2–1–0 || 4 || 
|-  style="text-align:center; background:#cfc;"
| 4 || January 25 || Ottawa Senators || 6–4 ||  || Lindback || Tampa Bay Times Forum || 19,204 || 3–1–0 || 6 || 
|-  style="text-align:center; background:#cfc;"
| 5 || January 27 || Philadelphia Flyers || 5–1 ||  || Lindback || Tampa Bay Times Forum || 19,204 || 4–1–0 || 8 || 
|-  style="text-align:center; background:#cfc;"
| 6 || January 29 || Florida Panthers || 5–2 ||  || Lindback || Tampa Bay Times Forum || 19,204 || 5–1–0 || 10 || 
|-

|-  style="text-align:center; background:#cfc;"
| 7 || February 1 || Winnipeg Jets || 8–3 ||  || Lindback || Tampa Bay Times Forum || 19,204 || 6–1–0 || 12 || 
|-  style="text-align:center; background:#fcc;"
| 8 || February 2 || New York Rangers || 2–3 ||  || Garon || Tampa Bay Times Forum || 19,204 || 6–2–0 || 12 || 
|-  style="text-align:center; background:#fcc;"
| 9 || February 5 || @ Philadelphia Flyers || 1–2 ||  || Lindback || Wells Fargo Center || 19,616 || 6–3–0 || 12 || 
|-  style="text-align:center; background:#fcc;"
| 10 || February 7 || @ New Jersey Devils || 2–4 ||  || Lindback || Prudential Center || 14,802 || 6–4–0 || 12 || 
|-  style="text-align:center; background:#ccc;"
| – || February 9 || @ Boston Bruins || colspan="8"|Game rescheduled to April 25 due to a blizzard in Boston.
|-  style="text-align:center; background:#fcc;"
| 11 || February 10 || @ New York Rangers || 1–5 ||  || Garon || Madison Square Garden || 17,200 || 6–5–0 || 12 || 
|-  style="text-align:center; background:#b0c4de;"
| 12 || February 12 || Montreal Canadiens || 3–4 || SO || Lindback || Tampa Bay Times Forum || 19,204 || 6–5–1 || 13 || 
|-  style="text-align:center; background:#fcc;"
| 13 || February 14 || Washington Capitals || 3–4 ||  || Garon || Tampa Bay Times Forum || 19,204 || 6–6–1 || 13 || 
|-  style="text-align:center; background:#cfc;"
| 14 || February 16 || @ Florida Panthers || 6–5 || OT || Lindback || BB&T Center || 17,009 || 7–6–1 || 15 || 
|-  style="text-align:center; background:#cfc;"
| 15 || February 19 || Toronto Maple Leafs || 4–2 ||  || Lindback || Tampa Bay Times Forum || 19,204 || 8–6–1 || 17 || 
|-  style="text-align:center; background:#fcc;"
| 16 || February 21 || Boston Bruins || 2–4 ||  || Lindback || Tampa Bay Times Forum || 19,204 || 8–7–1 || 17 || 
|-  style="text-align:center; background:#cfc;"
| 17 || February 23 || @ Carolina Hurricanes || 5–2 ||  || Garon || PNC Arena || 18,680 || 9–7–1 || 19 || 
|-  style="text-align:center; background:#fcc;"
| 18 || February 24 || @ Pittsburgh Penguins || 3–5 ||  || Garon || Consol Energy Center || 18,632 || 9–8–1 || 19 || 
|-  style="text-align:center; background:#fcc;"
| 19 || February 26 || Buffalo Sabres || 1–2 ||  || Garon || Tampa Bay Times Forum || 19,204 || 9–9–1 || 19 || 
|-  style="text-align:center; background:#fcc;"
| 20 || February 28 || @ New York Rangers || 1–4 ||  || Garon || Madison Square Garden || 17,200 || 9–10–1 || 19 || 
|-

|-  style="text-align:center; background:#fcc;"
| 21 || March 2 || @ Boston Bruins || 2–3 ||  || Garon || TD Garden || 17,565 || 9–11–1 || 19 || 
|-  style="text-align:center; background:#fcc;"
| 22 || March 4 || @ Pittsburgh Penguins || 3–4 ||  || Lindback || Consol Energy Center || 18,656 || 9–12–1 || 19 || 
|-  style="text-align:center; background:#cfc;"
| 23 || March 5 || @ New Jersey Devils || 5–2 ||  || Lindback || Prudential Center || 15,229 || 10–12–1 || 21 || 
|-  style="text-align:center; background:#fcc;"
| 24 || March 7 || Winnipeg Jets || 1–2 ||  || Lindback || Tampa Bay Times Forum || 19,204 || 10–13–1 || 21 || 
|-  style="text-align:center; background:#fcc;"
| 25 || March 9 || Montreal Canadiens || 3–4 ||  || Desjardins || Tampa Bay Times Forum || 19,204 || 10–14–1 || 21 || 
|-  style="text-align:center; background:#cfc;"
| 26 || March 12 || @ Florida Panthers || 3–2 ||  || Lindback || BB&T Center || 15,174 || 11–14–1 || 23 || 
|-  style="text-align:center; background:#fcc;"
| 27 || March 14 || New York Islanders || 0–2 ||  || Lindback || Tampa Bay Times Forum || 19,204 || 11–15–1 || 23 || 
|-  style="text-align:center; background:#cfc;"
| 28 || March 16 || Carolina Hurricanes || 4–1 ||  || Garon || Tampa Bay Times Forum || 19,204 || 12–15–1 || 25 || 
|-  style="text-align:center; background:#cfc;"
| 29 || March 18 || Philadelphia Flyers || 4–2 ||  || Lindback || Tampa Bay Times Forum || 19,204 || 13–15–1 || 27 || 
|-  style="text-align:center; background:#fcc;"
| 30 || March 20 || @ Toronto Maple Leafs || 2–4 ||  || Garon || Air Canada Centre || 19,433 || 13–16–1 || 27 || 
|-  style="text-align:center; background:#fcc;"
| 31 || March 23 || @ Ottawa Senators || 3–5 ||  || Desjardins || Scotiabank Place || 20,016 || 13–17–1 || 27 || 
|-  style="text-align:center; background:#fcc;"
| 32 || March 24 || @ Winnipeg Jets || 2–3 ||  || Desjardins || MTS Centre || 15,004 || 13–18–1 || 27 || 
|-  style="text-align:center; background:#cfc;"
| 33 || March 26 || Buffalo Sabres || 2–1 ||  || Garon || Tampa Bay Times Forum || 19,204 || 14–18–1 || 29 || 
|-  style="text-align:center; background:#cfc;"
| 34 || March 29 || New Jersey Devils || 5–4 || SO || Garon || Tampa Bay Times Forum || 19,204 || 15–18–1 || 31 || 
|-

|-  style="text-align:center; background:#b0c4de;"
| 35 || April 2 || Florida Panthers || 2–3 || SO || Garon || Tampa Bay Times Forum || 17,904 || 15–18–2 || 32 || 
|-  style="text-align:center; background:#cfc;"
| 36 || April 4 || @ Carolina Hurricanes || 5–0 ||  || Bishop || PNC Arena || 17,042 || 16–18–2 || 34 || 
|-  style="text-align:center; background:#fcc;"
| 37 || April 6 || @ New York Islanders || 2–4 ||  || Bishop || Nassau Veterans Memorial Coliseum || 16,170 || 16–19–2 || 34 ||
|-  style="text-align:center; background:#fcc;"
| 38 || April 7 || @ Washington Capitals || 2–4 ||  || Bishop || Verizon Center || 18,506 || 16–20–2 || 34 || 
|-  style="text-align:center; background:#cfc;"
| 39 || April 9 || Ottawa Senators || 3–2 ||  || Bishop || Tampa Bay Times Forum || 17,323 || 17–20–2 || 36 || 
|-  style="text-align:center; background:#fcc;"
| 40 || April 11 || Pittsburgh Penguins || 3–6 ||  || Bishop || Tampa Bay Times Forum || 19,204 || 17–21–2 || 36 || 
|-  style="text-align:center; background:#b0c4de;"
| 41 || April 13 || @ Washington Capitals  || 5–6 || OT || Garon || Verizon Center || 18,506 || 17–21–3 || 37 || 
|-  style="text-align:center; background:#fcc;"
| 42 || April 14 || @ Buffalo Sabres || 1–3 ||  || Garon || First Niagara Center || 18,991 || 17–22–3 || 37 || 
|-  style="text-align:center; background:#b0c4de;"
| 43 || April 16 || @ Winnipeg Jets || 3–4 || SO || Bishop || MTS Centre || 15,004 || 17–22–4 || 38 || 
|-  style="text-align:center; background:#fcc;"
| 44 || April 18 || @ Montreal Canadiens || 2–3 ||  || Bishop || Bell Centre || 21,273 || 17–23–4 || 38 || 
|-  style="text-align:center; background:#fcc;"
| 45 || April 21 || Carolina Hurricanes || 2–3 ||  || Lindback || Tampa Bay Times Forum || 19,204 || 17–24–4 || 38 || 
|-  style="text-align:center; background:#cfc;"
| 46 || April 24 || Toronto Maple Leafs || 5–2 ||  || Bishop || Tampa Bay Times Forum || 18,826 || 18–24–4 || 40 || 
|-  style="text-align:center; background:#fcc;"
| 47 || April 25 || @ Boston Bruins || 0–2 ||  || Lindback || TD Garden || 17,565 || 18–25–4 || 40 || 
|-  style="text-align:center; background:#fcc;"
| 48 || April 27 || Florida Panthers || 3–5 ||  || Lindback || Tampa Bay Times Forum || 19,204 || 18–26–4 || 40 || 
|-

|-
| 2012–13 Regular Season Schedule
|-
| Lightning score listed first;

Playoffs
The Lightning were unable to qualify for the playoffs for the second year in a row.

Player stats
Final stats

Skaters

Goaltenders

†Denotes player spent time with another team before joining Tampa Bay.  Stats reflect time with Tampa Bay only.
‡Traded to Tampa Bay mid-season.
Bold/italics denotes franchise record

Awards and records

Awards

Milestones

Transactions
The Lightning have been involved in the following transactions during the 2012–13 season.

Trades

Free agents signed

Free agents lost

Claimed via waivers

Lost via waivers

Lost via retirement

Player signings

Draft picks

Tampa Bay Lightning's picks at the 2012 NHL Entry Draft, held in Pittsburgh, Pennsylvania on June 22 & 23, 2012.

Draft Notes

  The Detroit Red Wings' first-round pick went to the Tampa Bay Lightning as a result of a February 21, 2012, trade that sent Kyle Quincey to the Red Wings in exchange for Sebastien Piche and this pick.
  The Philadelphia Flyers' second-round pick (originally from the Florida Panthers) went to the Tampa Bay Lightning as a result of a February 18, 2012, trade that sent Pavel Kubina to the Flyers in exchange for Jon Kalinski, 2013 fourth-round pick and this pick.
 The Tampa Bay Lightning's fifth-round pick went to the Boston Bruins as the result of a June 23, 2012, trade that sent Benoit Pouliot to the Lightning in exchange for Michel Ouellet and this pick.
 The Tampa Bay Lightning's seventh-round pick went to the San Jose Sharks as the result of a February 16, 2012, trade that sent a 2012 second-round pick to the Lightning in exchange for Dominic Moore and this pick.
  The Nashville Predators' seventh-round pick went to the Tampa Bay Lightning as a result of a June 15, 2012, trade that sent Sebastien Caron, two 2012 second-round picks and a 2013 third-round pick to the Predators in exchange for Anders Lindback, Kyle Wilson and this pick.

See also
 2012–13 NHL season

References

Tampa Bay Lightning seasons
T
T
Tampa Bay Lightning
Tampa Bay Lightning